Tommie Lindsey (born September 28, 1951 Oakland, California) is a Forensics coach, at James Logan High School.

Life
He graduated valedictorian from the University of San Francisco in Communication Arts and Social Science. He would later go on to receive an honorary PhD from the University of San Francisco for "Visionary Leadership".
40 percent of students at Logan High School go to college: 90 percent of his forensics students do.

Family
Tommie Lindsey has two children, a daughter and a son.

Awards
 1994 California Teacher of the Year
 2000 "National Forensics Coach of the Year"
 2003 Oprah Winfrey Angel Award
 2004 MacArthur Fellows Program
 2012 Bronx Achievement Award
 2015 Carlston Family Foundation Award

Works
 It Doesn't Take A Genius: Five Truths to Inspire Success in Every Student. Authors Randall McCutcheon, Tommie Lindsey, McGraw-Hill, 2006,

References

External links
"Accidental Hero",
"Tommie Lindsey", Answers.com

1951 births
People from Oakland, California
University of San Francisco alumni
MacArthur Fellows
Living people